Dean Hargrove (born July 27, 1938 in Iola, Kansas) is an American television producer, writer, and director. His background includes graduating the St. John's Military School, Wichita State University, and attending the UCLA Film School as a graduate student. He specializes in creating mystery series. He frequently worked with television producer Fred Silverman and television writer Joel Steiger.

Early career
Hargrove received an Emmy nomination in his early 20s as a writer for a short-lived NBC series with Bob Newhart, The Bob Newhart Show, not to be confused with the 1972-78 CBS series of the same name.

The Man from U.N.C.L.E.
He became a writer for The Man from U.N.C.L.E. late in the show's first season (1964). His biggest involvement with U.N.C.L.E. was in the second season when he wrote episodes that included a two-parter, "The Alexander the Greater Affair", later repackaged as the film One Spy Too Many. He did not work on the third season of U.N.C.L.E. and wrote just one two-parter for the short-lived fourth season.

Columbo and Matlock
After U.N.C.L.E., he worked at Universal Studios' television section on shows like It Takes a Thief, The Name of the Game and Columbo. He scripted the second Columbo pilot, "Ransom for a Dead Man", and was producer for the second, third and fourth seasons. More recently, he has worked for Viacom Productions and Paramount Network Television, producing the shows Matlock on NBC and ABC from 1986 to 1995, Jake and the Fatman on CBS from 1987 to 1992, and Diagnosis: Murder on CBS from 1993 to 2002.

Personal life
Hargrove married Paula Vernay, an actress and model born in Iran. They divorced and he married actress Brenda Scott in 1979.

Awards
Hargrove won a Primetime Emmy Award for Columbo in 1974 and was nominated on four other occasions.

Filmography (selected television)

References

External links
 
 

1938 births
Living people
People from Iola, Kansas
American television producers
American male screenwriters
American television directors
Screenwriters from Kansas